The Benton MacKaye Trail Association (BMTA) was organized in 1979 and incorporated in 1980 to build and maintain the Benton MacKaye Trail (BMT).  Driving the effort was a desire to see opened for hiking Benton MacKaye's chosen route for his Appalachian mountain trail.  MacKaye (rhymes with sky), Massachusetts forester and co-founder of The Wilderness Society, was the man whose vision inspired what is today the Appalachian Trail.  In the south, he had selected a more westerly route, along the western crest of the Blue Ridge, roughly that followed today by the BMT. The BMTA's 25th anniversary year saw the original plan completed as the route was officially opened on July 16, 2005.

As with most trail organizations, the BMTA is an all-volunteer, nonprofit group of people who want to see the trail remain open and in good condition for hiking. Those members who live close enough gather regularly on work trips to maintain the trail.  They also participate in group hikes.  The Association is sustained by member and donor contributions.

References
"Benton MacKaye Trail Association"

Organizations established in 1979